Freshwater railway station was the westerly terminus and largest station of the Freshwater, Yarmouth and Newport Railway, the platform being extended to accommodate the "Tourist Train", a non-stop service from Ventnor.

History
Incorporated as the Freshwater, Yarmouth and Newport Railway Company in 1860, and opened over a ten-month period between 1888 and 1889, it closed 65 years later, having been situated too far from the tourist honeypots of The Needles and Alum Bay to be consistently profitable. There was a run-round loop, and a goods siding often used for cattle loading. After closure the station was built over by a factory, but this in turn has been demolished and a supermarket now occupies the site.

Stationmasters
Frederick George Drudge 1889 - ca. 1894 (formerly station master at Horringford)
William Denyer ca. 1899 ca. 1901
F. Newland 1905 - 1908 (afterwards station master at Whitwell)
Samuel John Urry 1908 - ca. 1915 (formerly station master at Shide, then Calbourne)
S. Russell ca. 1936

See also 

 List of closed railway stations in Britain

References

External links 
 Freshwater station on navigable 1946 O. S. map

Disused railway stations on the Isle of Wight
Former Freshwater, Yarmouth and Newport Railway stations
Railway stations in Great Britain opened in 1889
Railway stations in Great Britain closed in 1953